The group stage of the 2013 CAF Champions League was played from 20 July to 22 September 2013. A total of eight teams competed in the group stage.

Draw
The draw for the group stage was held on 14 May 2013, 14:00 UTC+2, at the CAF Headquarters in Cairo, Egypt. The eight winners of the second round were drawn into two groups of four. Each group contained one team from Pot 1, one team from Pot 2, and two teams from Pot 3.

The following eight teams were entered into the draw:

Pot 1
 Espérance de Tunis
 Al-Ahly

Pot 2
 AC Léopards
 Coton Sport

Pot 3
 Zamalek
 Séwé Sport

 
 Orlando Pirates
 Recreativo do Libolo

Format
In the group stage, each group was played on a home-and-away round-robin basis. The winners and runners-up of each group advanced to the semi-finals.

Tiebreakers
The teams are ranked according to points (3 points for a win, 1 point for a tie, 0 points for a loss). If tied on points, tiebreakers are applied in the following order:
Number of points obtained in games between the teams concerned
Goal difference in games between the teams concerned
Away goals scored in games between the teams concerned
Goal difference in all games
Goals scored in all games

Groups
The matchdays were 19–21 July, 2–4 August, 16–18 August, 30 August–1 September, 13–15 September, and 20–22 September 2013.

Group A

Group B

References

External links

2